Vieux may refer to:

Places
Vieux, Calvados, in the Calvados department, France
Vieux, Tarn, in the Tarn department, France
Vieux-Bourg, in the Calvados department, France
Vieux-Fumé, in the Calvados department, France
Vieux-Pont-en-Auge, in the Calvados department, France
Vieux Fort, one of the district Quarters located on the island of Saint Lucia
Le Vieux-Longueuil, a borough in the city of Longueuil, Quebec, Canada

People
Maurice Vieux, French altiste
Alex Vieux, French businessman
Krewe du Vieux, a New Orleans Mardi Gras krewe

Beverages
 Vieux, the Dutch name for Dutch brandy, Dutch imitation Cognac

See also
 Vieu